Norah Mary Vincent (September 20, 1968 – July 6, 2022) was an American writer. She was a weekly columnist for the Los Angeles Times and a quarterly columnist on politics and culture for the national gay and lesbian news magazine The Advocate. She was a columnist for The Village Voice and Salon.com. Her writing appeared in The New Republic, The New York Times, New York Post, The Washington Post and other periodicals. She gained particular attention in 2006 for her book, Self-Made Man, detailing her experiences when she lived as a man for eighteen months.

Early life
Norah Mary Vincent was born in Detroit, and grew up both there and in London, where her father was employed as a lawyer for the Ford Motor Company. She attended Williams College, where she graduated with a BA in philosophy in 1990, before undertaking graduate studies at Boston College. She also worked as an editor for Free Press.

Career

Self-Made Man
Vincent's book Self-Made Man (2006) retells an eighteen-month experiment in the early 2000s in which she disguised herself as a man. This was compared to previous undercover journalism such as Black Like Me. Vincent was interviewed by Juju Chang on the ABC News program 20/20 and talked about the experience in HARDtalk extra on BBC on April 21, 2006, where she described her experiences in male-male and male-female relationships. She joined an all-male bowling club, joined a men's therapy group, went to a strip club, dated women, and used her knowledge as a lapsed Catholic to visit monks in a monastery. 

Vincent wrote that the only time she has ever been considered excessively feminine was during her stint as a man. Her alter ego, Ned, was assumed to be gay on several occasions. Features which had been perceived as butch when she presented as a woman were perceived as oddly effeminate when she presented as a man. Vincent asserted that, since the experiment, she had more fully realized the benefits of being female and the disadvantages of being male, stating, "I really like being a woman. ... I like it more now because I think it's more of a privilege."  

Vincent also stated that she had gained more sympathy and understanding for men and the male condition: "Men are suffering. They have different problems than women have but they don't have it better. They need our sympathy, they need our love, and they need each other more than anything else. They need to be together."

Voluntary Madness
Vincent's book Voluntary Madness (2008) relates her experiences as an inpatient in three institutions for mentally ill patients: "a ward in a public city hospital, a private Midwestern institution, and a pricey New Age clinic." She criticized doctors who she claimed were unapproachable, noting that too many relied on drugs as therapy, while others addressed only symptoms instead of their underlying causes.

Vincent's book also addresses the question of pseudopatients and those who remained ill because of their lack of willingness to cooperate in their therapy.

Later work
Vincent later wrote two novels: Thy Neighbor (2012), described by The New York Times as "a dark, comic thriller," and Adeline (2015), which imagines the life of Virginia Woolf from when she wrote To the Lighthouse until her suicide in 2022.

Personal life, views, and death 
Vincent, a lesbian, was briefly married to Kristen Erickson, but soon divorced.

Vincent was described as a libertarian who was critical of postmodernism and multiculturalism. She did not believe that transgender people were the sex they identified as, leading her to be accused of bigotry. In an article for The Village Voice, she wrote: "[Transsexuality] signifies the death of the self, the soul, that good old-fashioned indubitable 'I' so beloved of Descartes, whose great adage 'I think, therefore I am' has become an ontological joke on the order of 'I tinker, and there I am.'"

In Voluntary Madness, Vincent details her decade-long history with treatment-resistant depression, saying: "...my brain was never quite the same after I zapped it with that first course of SSRIs.” The mental strain of maintaining a false identity during the making of Self-Made Man ultimately caused a depressive breakdown, leading Vincent to admit herself to a locked psychiatric facility. 

Vincent died via assisted suicide at a clinic in Switzerland on July 6, 2022, aged 53. Her death was not reported until August 2022.

Publications

 Self-Made Man (Viking Adult, 2006)
 Voluntary Madness (Viking Adult, 2008)
 Thy Neighbor (Viking Adult, 2012)
 Adeline: A Novel of Virginia Woolf (Houghton Mifflin Harcourt, 2015)

References

External links
Village Voice articles
Tony Dokoupil: Ann Marlowe, the Memoir, and the Self-Made Man in New Partisan
ABC News 20/20 Program Segment

1968 births
2022 deaths
2022 suicides
20th-century American journalists
20th-century American women writers
21st-century American journalists
21st-century American novelists
21st-century American women writers
American columnists
American expatriates in England
American feminist writers
American lesbian writers
American libertarians
American literary editors
American women journalists
American women novelists
Critics of multiculturalism
Critics of postmodernism
Deaths by euthanasia
Female suicides
Female-to-male cross-dressers
American LGBT journalists
LGBT people from Michigan
American LGBT writers
Los Angeles Times people
Psychiatric false diagnosis
The Village Voice people
Undercover journalists
Williams College alumni
Writers from Detroit